The 2007 Nashville Kats season was the third season for the franchise since they resumed operations. They look to make the playoffs again after finishing 2006 with an 8–8 record. They went 7–9 and missed playoffs. This season was also the final season for the Nashville Kats. The team ceased operations again 4 months later.

Schedule

Coaching
Pat Sperduto started his third season of his second stint as head coach of the Kats.

Stats

Offense

Quarterback

Running backs

Wide receivers

Touchdowns

Defense

Special teams

Kick return

Kicking

Regular season

Week 1: vs Columbus Destroyers

Scoring summary:

1st Quarter:

2nd Quarter:

3rd Quarter:

4th Quarter:

Week 2: vs Philadelphia Soul

Scoring summary:

1st Quarter:

2nd Quarter:

3rd Quarter:

4th Quarter:

Week 3: vs Utah Blaze

Scoring summary:

1st Quarter:

2nd Quarter:

3rd Quarter:

4th Quarter:

Week 4: at Austin Wranglers

Scoring summary:

1st Quarter:

2nd Quarter:

3rd Quarter:

4th Quarter:

Week 5: at Colorado Crush

Scoring summary:

1st Quarter:

2nd Quarter:

3rd Quarter:

4th Quarter:

Week 6: vs Chicago Rush

Scoring summary:

1st Quarter:

2nd Quarter:

3rd Quarter:

4th Quarter:

Week 7: at Arizona Rattlers

Scoring summary:

1st Quarter:

2nd Quarter:

3rd Quarter:

4th Quarter:

Week 8: vs Kansas City Brigade

Scoring summary:

1st Quarter:

2nd Quarter:

3rd Quarter:

4th Quarter:

Week 9: at Dallas Desperados

Scoring summary:

1st Quarter:

2nd Quarter:

3rd Quarter:

4th Quarter:

Week 10: at Grand Rapids Rampage

Scoring summary:

1st Quarter:

2nd Quarter:

3rd Quarter:

4th Quarter:

Week 11: vs Colorado Crush

Scoring summary:

1st Quarter:

2nd Quarter:

3rd Quarter:

4th Quarter:

Week 12: at Chicago Rush

Scoring summary:

1st Quarter:

2nd Quarter:

3rd Quarter:

4th Quarter:

Week 13: vs San Jose SaberCats

Scoring summary:

1st Quarter:

2nd Quarter:

3rd Quarter:

4th Quarter:

Week 15: at Las Vegas Gladiators

Scoring summary:

1st Quarter:

2nd Quarter:

3rd Quarter:

4th Quarter:

Week 16: at Kansas City Brigade

Scoring summary:

1st Quarter:

2nd Quarter:

3rd Quarter:

4th Quarter:

Week 17: vs Grand Rapids Rampage

Scoring summary:

1st Quarter:

2nd Quarter:

3rd Quarter:

4th Quarter:

External links
Official stat page

Nashville Kats
Nashville Kats seasons
Nash